Kévin Lacroix (born 13 October 1984 in Paris) is a French football player of Guadeloupean descent who plays as a central defender for Racing FC Union Luxembourg.

Lacroix spent five seasons with amateur French club ESA Brive who were playing in the Championnat de France amateur, the fourth division of French football. In 2007, he joined German club Eintracht Trier in the Regionalliga West. He left the club in 2010.

In May 2010, Lacroix was reported to have signed a contract with another German club Sportfreunde Lotte. In July 2010, he went on trial with English club Yeovil Town and appeared in a friendly match against Swansea City with the team, but was ultimately not signed. Lacroix is also a Guadeloupean international and made his debut in 2010 playing in the qualifying matches for the 2010 Caribbean Championship.

References

External links
 
 

1984 births
Living people
Footballers from Paris
Association football defenders
French people of Guadeloupean descent
Guadeloupean footballers
Expatriate footballers in Germany
French expatriate sportspeople in Germany
SV Eintracht Trier 05 players
Expatriate footballers in Luxembourg
French expatriate sportspeople in Luxembourg